Bourgtheroulde-Infreville is a former commune in the Eure department in Normandy in northern France. It is the seat of the commune of Grand-Bourgtheroulde.

History
The Battle of Bourgthéroulde was fought between English loyalist and Norman rebels in 1124. On 1 January 2016, Bosc-Bénard-Commin, Bourgtheroulde-Infreville and Thuit-Hébert merged, becoming one commune called Grand-Bourgtheroulde.

Population

See also
Communes of the Eure department

References

External links

Official site

Former communes of Eure